Alja Kozorog (born 17 December 1996) is a Slovenian slalom canoeist who has competed at the international level since 2012. She is from Idrija pri Bači and trains with KK Soške Elektrarne. Alja is coached by 1992 Olympian Borut Javornik.

Kozorog won a silver medal in the C1 team event at the 2020 European Championships in Prague. She also a silver medal in C1 team event at the 2017 U23 Euros in Hohenlimburg. Alja earned her best senior world championship result of 19th in the C1 event at the 2019 championships in La Seu d'Urgell,  which secured Slovenia an Olympic quota. She finished in a career-best 4th place at the 2019 World Cup on her home course in Tacen.

Kozorog finished in 12th place at the 2021 European Championships in Ivrea, ensuring her position at the delayed Games. Alja represented Slovenia in the C1 event at the delayed 2020 Summer Olympics in Tokyo, where she finished 12th after being eliminated in the semifinal.

Alja has studied at the University of Ljubljana where she completed a master's degree in Kinesiology in 2019.

References

External links 

1996 births
Living people
Slovenian female canoeists
Olympic canoeists of Slovenia
People from the Municipality of Tolmin
University of Ljubljana alumni
Canoeists at the 2020 Summer Olympics
20th-century Slovenian women
21st-century Slovenian women